Gulowa Island is an island of Papua New Guinea.

Islands of Papua New Guinea